The men's freestyle middleweight was a freestyle wrestling event held as part of the Wrestling at the 1924 Summer Olympics programme. It was the third appearance of the event. Middleweight was the third-heaviest category, including wrestlers weighing from 72 to 79 kilograms.

Results
Source: Official results; Wudarski

Gold medal round

Silver medal round

Bronze medal round

References

Wrestling at the 1924 Summer Olympics